Rhinella humboldti (common name: Rivero's toad) is a species of toad in the family Bufonidae. It is found in Colombia, Venezuela, Trinidad, and the Guianas. This species was originally considered to be a subspecies of Rhinella granulosa (as Bufo granulosus humboldti).

Rhinella humboldti is an abundant species. It is generally a terrestrial toad found in lowland plains, savanna, and dry forests. It can penetrate into forests by following roads and lumber tracts. On Trinidad, it is found in cane fields, rice fields, and other open agricultural areas. Breeding takes place in temporary and permanent ponds.

References

humboldti
Amphibians described in 1965
Amphibians of Colombia
Amphibians of French Guiana
Amphibians of Guyana
Amphibians of Suriname
Amphibians of Trinidad and Tobago
Amphibians of Venezuela
Taxonomy articles created by Polbot
Taxobox binomials not recognized by IUCN